Pamela L. Hornberger (born May 1968) is an American politician. Hornberger is a Republican member of the Michigan House of Representatives.

Education 
In 1991, Hornberger earned a BS degree in Management from Michigan State University. In 1993, Hornberger earned a Certified Teacher from Wayne State University. In 1996, Hornberger earned a master's degree in Education Administration from Saginaw Valley State University.

Career 
Hornberger was an art teacher in the East China School District in East China Township, Michigan. In 1994, Hornberger became a teacher at Imlay City Community Schools.

Hornberger also served as a member of the L'Anse Creuse school board for six years, where she was treasurer. She also served as a member of the local Selective Service System board.

She became increasingly active in politics and in 2016 ran for the State House. In November 2016, Hornberger was elected as a member of Michigan House of Representatives for District 32. Hornberger is the chairwoman of the House Education Committee.

Following the 2020 Michigan House of Representatives election where the GOP caucus maintained its 58–52 majority, Hornberger was selected by her Republican colleagues to serve as Speaker pro tempore of the House for the 2021-22 legislative sessions, to succeed the Jason Wentworth, who was selected to serve as the next Speaker of the House.

Personal life 
Hornberger is a resident of Chesterfield Township, Michigan.

See also 
 2018 Michigan House of Representatives election

References

External links
 Campaign website
 Pamela L. Hornberger at ballotpedia.org

1968 births
21st-century American politicians
21st-century American women politicians
Living people
Republican Party members of the Michigan House of Representatives
Michigan State University alumni
Saginaw Valley State University alumni
Wayne State University alumni
Women state legislators in Michigan